The 1961 Motocross World Championship was the 5th edition of the Motocross World Championship organized by the FIM and reserved for 500cc and 250cc motorcycles.

Summary
Sten Lundin, riding a Monark motorcycle rebadged as a Lito, took an early championship lead by winning the first three Grand Prix races of the year then, held off a challenge from Husqvarna's Bill Nilsson to claim his second 500cc Motocross World Championship. Dave Bickers riding for the Greeves factory racing team claimed his second consecutive 250cc European Motocross Championship over his countrymen, BSA teammates Arthur Lampkin and Jeff Smith. Future four-time 250cc world champion, Torsten Hallman, wins the first world championship race of his career at the 1961 250cc Finnish Grand Prix.

Grands Prix

500cc

250cc

Final standings

Points are awarded to the top 6 classified finishers.

500cc

250cc

Notes

References

Motocross World Championship seasons
Motocross World Championship